Alaska  is a periodical devoted to news and discussion of issues and features of and from Alaska. Most of its readership consists of persons outside of Alaska who are interested in the Alaskan way of life.

History and profile
Alaska magazine was founded in 1935 in Ketchikan, Alaska, by Emery Fridolf Tobin (1895-1977) and J. Ray Roady (1907-1997). Tobin established himself as an opponent of Alaska statehood, although this may have been contradictory, given his ties to the Democratic party and the fact that he and Roady served as State Representatives in 1959.

Alaska magazine was originally titled the Alaska Sportsman Magazine, a name it retained until 1969. Another major difference is that the editorial and sales offices have moved to Alaska's economic center, the city of Anchorage.

The magazine was sold to the partnership of fur trader Robert A. Henning and journalist Robert N. DeArmond in 1958.  Henning helmed the magazine for nearly 30 years, mostly under the corporate name of Alaska Northwest Publishing Company, and was known as an enthusiastic promoter of Alaska.  Henning, quoted in 1971 about the magazine, said "I'm my own best customer when it comes to selling Alaska.  We haven't scratched the surface of the tourist business yet".

, the magazine was owned by Morris Communications, a Georgia-based company which also publishes The Milepost travel guide. Morris acquired Alaska Magazine in 1995.

References

External links
 

1935 establishments in Alaska
Lifestyle magazines published in the United States
Ketchikan, Alaska
Local interest magazines published in the United States
Magazines established in 1935
Magazines published in Alaska
Mass media in Anchorage, Alaska
Morris Communications